Rhynchocladium is a monotypic genus of flowering plants belonging to the family Cyperaceae. The only species is Rhynchocladium steyermarkii.

Its native range is Southern Venezuela to Guyana.

References

Cyperaceae
Cyperaceae genera
Monotypic Poales genera